Taurus Ox is a Lao restaurant in Seattle, in the U.S. state of Washington.

Description 
Taurus Ox is a counter service restaurant serving Lao cuisine in Seattle's Capitol Hill neighborhood. The menu has included sausage, khao soi, phad lao, papaya salad, thom khem, chicken laap, and sticky rice wine.

History 
Taurus Ox opened in December 2019, in a space which previously housed Little Uncle. The restaurant was vandalized in 2020. Sydney Clark, Khampaeng Panyathong, and Jenessa Sneva are chefs as of 2022.

Reception 

Allecia Vermillion included the business in Seattle Metropolitan'''s 2021 list of "The Best Restaurants on Capitol Hill" and wrote, "Taurus Ox makes, indisputably, one of the best burgers in town, a pair of proper smash patties, two versions of the condiment jeaw, house-cured pork jowl in place of bacon. It's cross-culturally clever and drive-across-town good." Vermillion also included the restaurant in a list of "The Best Burgers in Seattle". The magazine included Taurus Ox in a 2022 list of "Seattle's 100 Best Restaurants". Naomi Tomky included the restaurant in Thrillist's 2021 list of "The 14 Best Burger Joints in Seattle". 

Gabe Guarente, Mark Van Streefkerk, and Jade Yamazaki Stewart included Taurus Ox in Eater Seattle'''s 2022 list of "25 Essential Capitol Hill Restaurants" and said "the smash burger made with pork jowl bacon and jaew tomato sauce may be the best patty in the city". The website also included Taurus Ox in a 2022 list of "38 Essential Restaurants in Seattle". The restaurant is a favorite of Shota Nakajima.

References

External links

 
 

2019 establishments in Washington (state)
Asian restaurants in Seattle
Capitol Hill, Seattle
Lao cuisine
Laotian-American culture
Restaurants established in 2019